Heiligenbrunn is a town in the district of Güssing in the Austrian state of Burgenland.

Population

References

Cities and towns in Güssing District